The U.S. Nationals (commonly The Big Go) is an NHRA-sanctioned drag racing event, generally considered to be the most prestigious drag racing event in the world due to its history, size, and purse, held annually at Lucas Oil Indianapolis Raceway Park in Brownsburg, Indiana.

Traditionally a Labor Day weekend event, the eliminations are usually held on Monday, but moved to Sunday in 2020 and 2021 because of logistics as a result of the coronavirus pandemic compacted the NHRA schedule and for live television purposes (the final round airs live on Fox), and is the longest-running Labor Day motorsports event in the United States, a distinction it earned in 2004.  The U.S. Nationals air on the Fox broadcast network under the current broadcast contract.

The first edition of the NHRA Nationals was held at the Great Bend Municipal Airport in Great Bend, Kansas in 1955. The event moved first to Oklahoma City's Oklahoma State Fairgrounds for the "4th annual National Championship Drag Races Sponsored by the National Hot Rod Association" in 1958, then moved to Detroit Dragway in Detroit, Michigan for 1959-1960 before moving to Indianapolis Raceway Park in 1961, and has remained there ever since, after a verbal deal was made between NHRA founder and Board Chairman Wally Parks and the then-owners of the track. In 1979, the NHRA bought the entire complex. In 2006, it was renamed O'Reilly Raceway Park at Indianapolis, after auto parts supplier O'Reilly Auto Parts purchased naming rights. In 2011, Lucas Oil purchased the rights, renaming the venue Lucas Oil Raceway at Indianapolis but then in 2022 it was renamed Lucas Oil Indianapolis Raceway Park.

Past winners

Professional class winners

References 

Drag racing events
Motorsport in Indianapolis
National Hot Rod Association